Garden patience is a common name for several species of docks (Rumex):

 Rumex crispus (curly dock), native to Europe and western Asia
 Rumex patientia (patience dock)